Meeting David Wilson is a 2008 American documentary film. It is a 90-minute video produced for initial presentation on the MSNBC cable channel. Its focus is the encounter between David A. Wilson, a black American filmmaker who grew up in Newark, New Jersey, and David B. Wilson, a descendant of a white American tobacco-planter who had owned some of the black Wilsons’ ancestors as slaves. The film was directed by Daniel Woolsey and David A. Wilson and produced by Barion Grant.

The Wilsons and Barion founded an African-American News website at NBC News entitled The Grio.

Post-premiere discussion 
The initial cable-TV broadcast was followed by a 90-minute "town hall" discussion recorded at Howard University a week before the broadcast.  Brian Williams moderated the event, and the following also participated:
 Cathy L. Lanier
 Michael Dyson 
 Kevin Powell
 Mike Barnicle
 Kriss Turner
 DeForest Soaries
 Greg Carr

External links 
 MSNBC coverage
 theGrio at NBC News

Documentary films about African Americans
2008 television films
2008 films
Documentary films about slavery in the United States
American documentary television films
2008 documentary films
MSNBC original programming
2000s American films